Helen Homans won the singles tennis title of the 1906 U.S. Women's National Singles Championship by defeating Maud Barger-Wallach  6–4, 6–3 in the final of the All Comers' tournament. Elisabeth Moore was the reigning champion but did not defend her title in the Challenge Round. The event was played on outdoor grass courts and held at the Philadelphia Cricket Club in Wissahickon Heights, Chestnut Hill, Philadelphia from June 19 through June 23, 1906.

Draw

All Comers' finals

References

1906
1906 in American women's sports
June 1906 sports events
Women's Singles
1906 in women's tennis
Chestnut Hill, Philadelphia
1900s in Philadelphia
1906 in sports in Pennsylvania
Women's sports in Pennsylvania